Thomas Anthony Garrity (born 1959) is an American mathematician. He teaches at Williams College, where he is the Webster Atwell Class of 1921 Professor of Mathematics.

Early life and education 

Thomas Anthony Garrity born in 1959 in the United States. He completed his bachelor's degree in mathematics at the University of Texas at Austin in 1981. He attended Brown University for doctoral studies, completing a PhD in mathematics in 1986 under the supervision of professor William Fulton. Garrity's doctoral thesis was titled On Ample Vector Bundles and Negative Curvature.

Career 

Garrity is currently a professor of mathematics at Williams College, where he has taught since 1989.

Bibliography 

His notable books include:

 Algebraic Geometry: A Problem Solving Approach

 All the Mathematics You Missed

 The United States of Mathematics Presidential Debate

References

External links 
 Website
 Mathematics Genealogy Project

American mathematicians
1959 births
Living people
University of Texas at Austin alumni
Brown University alumni
Williams College faculty